Alphonse de Chavanges (real name Alphonse de Bourlon) (4 June 1791 in Paris - 20 October 1831 in Paris) was a French officer and dramatist.

Biography 
Stepbrother and aide-de-camp of Marshal Augereau, colonel and battalion chief, his plays have been performed on the most famous Parisian stages during the 19th century : Théâtre de la Porte-Saint-Martin, Théâtre de l'Ambigu-Comique, Théâtre du Vaudeville etc.

Works 
1824: L'avocat et le médecin, 1 act comedy, with Armand-François Jouslin de La Salle
1824: La Famille du charlatan, 1 act folie-vaudeville, with Jouslin de La Salle and Maurice Alhoy
1824: Le colonel de Hussards, 3 act melodrama, with Constant Ménissier
1824: Jane-Shore, 3 act melodrama, with Jouslin de La Salle
1824: Le Passeport, 1 act comedy-vaudeville, with Ménissier and Ernest Renaud
1825: Le Docteur d'Altona, 3 act melodrama  with tableaux, with Hyacinthe Decomberousse and Auguste Maillard
1828: Le vieil artiste, ou, La séduction, 3 act melodrama, with Frédérick Lemaître
1828: L'Art de se présenter dans le monde, ou Miroir de l'homme de bonne compagnie, with Chollet
1829: L'Amour raisonnable, 1 act comedy in prose
1829: Lequel Des Deux ?, 1 act comedy, with Chollet
1830: Le souvenir, 1 act comedy
1834: Une fille d'Eve, 1 act comedy-vaudeville, with Philippe Dumanoir and Camille Pillet, posth.
1835: Le poltron, comédie-vaudeville en un acte, avec Jean-François-Alfred Bayard, posth.

Distinction 
 Chevalier of the Légion d'honneur, 1810

Bibliography 
 Joseph Marie Quérard, La France littéraire, 1828, p. 167

References

External links 
 Worldcat

1791 births
1831 deaths
19th-century French dramatists and playwrights
19th-century French military personnel
Burials at Père Lachaise Cemetery
Writers from Paris